Automatism is a set of brief unconscious behaviors, typically at least several seconds or minutes, while the subject is unaware of actions. This type of automatic behavior often occurs in certain types of epilepsy, such as complex partial seizures in those with temporal lobe epilepsy, or as a side effect of particular medications such as zolpidem.

Variations
Varying degrees of automatism may include simple gestures, such as finger rubbing, lip smacking, chewing, or swallowing, or more complex actions, such as sleepwalking behaviors. Others may include speech, which may or may not be coherent or sensible. The subject may or may not remain conscious otherwise throughout the episode. Conscious subjects may be fully aware of their other actions at the time, but unaware of their automatism.

In some more complex automatisms, the subject enters into the behaviors of sleepwalking while fully awake until it starts. In these episodes, which can last for longer periods of time, the subject proceeds to engage in routine activities such as cooking, showering, driving a familiar route, or even conversation. Following the episode, the subject regains consciousness, often feeling disoriented, and has no memory of the incident.

See also
Tic

References

External links 

Seizure types
Epilepsy types